Barbadian cuisine, also called Bajan cuisine, is a mixture of African, Portuguese, Indian, Irish, Creole, Indigenous and British background. A typical meal consists of a main dish of meat or fish, normally marinated with a mixture of herbs and spices, hot side dishes, and one or more salads.  The meal is usually served with one or more sauces.

The national dish of Barbados is cou-cou and fried flying fish with spicy gravy. Another traditional meal is pudding and souse, a dish of pickled pork with spiced sweet potatoes. A wide variety of seafood and meats are also available.

Main courses

 Fried flying fish
 Fried or grilled fish such as kingfish, swordfish, mahi mahi, and "dolphin" (dolphinfish). A whole roast red snapper is a delicacy.                                                    
 Brown stew chicken                                      
 Cou-cou and steamed flying fish             
 Barbecued or stewed lamb or pork chops
 Curry beef or mutton
Rotisserie chicken/pan chicken
 Baked or fried chicken
 Grilled or fried prawns
 Grilled turkey wings
 Saltfish in a spicy tomato sauce
 Pepperpot           
 Sweet potato pie
 Chicken curry
 Pickled chicken feet
 Barbequed pig tails
 Guava cheese
 Black cake

Hot side dishes

Rice and peas – rice with split peas and gravy.
Macaroni pie
Cou-cou
Sweet potato, grilled, mashed or as fries
English potato, grilled, mashed or as fries
Fried plantain
Breadfruit, grilled or fried
Chow mein
Steamed mixed vegetables, such as broccoli, pumpkin, cabbage, and onion
Buttered cassava or yam

Salads
Garden salad
Pasta salad
Potato salad
Coleslaw
Plain sweetcorn, beetroot, or pineapple

Sauces

Bajan pepper sauce
Ketchup
Tartar sauce for fish

Lighter meals

 Bakes
 Cassava pone, a kind of savoury cassava cake
 Conkies
 Cutters (fried flying fish in a bap)
 Fishcake
 Pumpkin soup
 Samosas, often made with conch
 Turnovers
 Wrap roti, usually with beef, chicken or saltfish with potatoes, spices, and sometimes chickpeas

Beverages

Rum and rum punch
Banks beer
Hibiscus tea
Mauby 
Fruit juice
Tamarind drink
Soursop drink
Golden apple drink
Sorrel drink
Coconut water
Ginger beer

Foreign food in Barbados
American staples such as hot dogs and burgers are fairly common, as are British fish and chips. Chinese, Indian, and Thai dishes are available in the main towns. A few Mexican and Brazilian restaurants are available on the South Coast. There are upmarket sushi restaurants in or near large resorts.

References

External links
 

 
Caribbean cuisine